The Lepidoptera of Guadeloupe consist of both the butterflies and moths recorded from the island of Guadeloupe.

According to a recent estimate, there are about 398 moth species and 58 butterfly species present in Guadeloupe.

Butterflies

Papilionidae
Battus polydamas neodamas (Lucas, 1852)
Appias drusilla boydi Comstock, 1943

Hesperiidae
Proteides mercurius angasi Godman & Salvin, 1884
Epargyreus zestos zestos (Geyer, 1832)
Polygonus leo leo (Gmelin, 1790)
Polygonus manueli punctus Bell & Comstock, 1948
Urbanus proteus domingo (Scudder, 1872)
Urbanus dorantes obscurus (Hewitson, 1867)
Astraptes talus (Cramer, 1777)
Astraptes anaphus anusis (Godman & Salvin, 1896)
Achlyodes mithridates minor Comstock, 1944
Ephyriades arcas arcas (Drury, 1773)
Ephyriades brunnea dominicensis Bell & Comstock, 1948
Pyrgus oileus oileus (Linné, 1767)
Hylephila phyleus phyleus (Drury, 1773)
Wallengrenia ophites (Mabille, 1878)
Calpodes ethlius (Stoll, 1782)
Panoquina panoquinoides panoquinoides Skinner, 1891
Panoquina lucas woodruffi Watson, 1937
Panoquina sylvicola (Herrich-Schäffer, 1865)
Nyctelius nyctelius agari (Dillon, 1947)

Pieridae
Ascia monuste f. virginia (Godart, 1819)
Eurema daira palmira (Poey, 1846)
Eurema lisa euterpe (Ménétriès, 1832)
Eurema leuce antillarum Hall, 1936
Eurema venusta emanona Dillon, 1947
Eurema nisevemanoma (Dillon, 1947)
Eurema elathea elathea (Cramer, 1777)
Anteos maerula (Fabricius, 1775)
Phoebis agarithe (Boisduval, 1836)
Phoebis sennae marcellina (Cramer, 1777)
Rhabdodryas trite watsoni (F. M. Brown, 1929)
Aphrissa statira (Cramer, 1777)

Nymphalidae
Danaus plexippus megalippe (Hübner, 1826)
Anaea minor Hall, 1936
Marpesia petreus (Cramer, 1776)
Historis odius orion (Fabricius 1775)
Hypolimnas misippus (Linné, 1764)
Junonia genoveva (Cramer, 1782)
Junonia evarete (Stoll, 1782)
Anartia jatrophae (Linné, 1763)
Biblis hyperia (Cramer, 1782)
Vanessa cardui (Linné, 1758)
Dryas iulia dominicana (Hall, 1917)
Agraulis vanillae insularis Maynard, 1889

Lycaenidae
Allosmaitia piplea (Godman & Salvin, 1896)
Chlorostrymon simaethis (Drury, 1773)
Chlorostrymon lalitae Brévignon, 2000
Ministrymon azia (Hewitson, 1873)
Strymon bubastus ponce (Comstock & Huntington, 1943)
Strymon columella (Fabricius, 1793)
Strymon acis (Drury, 1773)
Electrostrymon angerona (Godman & Salvin, 1896)
Electrostrymon angelia karukera Brévignon, 2000
Leptotes cassius chadwicki (Comstock & Huntington, 1943)
Hemiargus hanno watsoni (Comstock & Huntington, 1943)
Cyclargus thomasi woodruffi (Comstock & Huntington, 1943)

Moths

Arctiidae
Antichloris toddi Chalumeau & Howden, 1978
Cosmosoma demantria Druce, 1895
Ecpantheria guadulpensis (Oberthur, 1881)
Empyreuma affinis Rotschild, 1912
Epicepsis dominicensis Rotschild, 1911
Eucereon cyneburge betzi Chalumeau & Howden, 1978
Eucereon imriei Druce, 1884
Eucereon rogersi Druce, 1884
Eupseudosoma involutum (Sepp, [1855])
Halysidota leda (Druce, 1890)
Horama panthalon (Fabricius, 1793)
Horama pretus (Cramer, 1777)
Hyalurga vinosa (Drury, [1773])
Hypercompe icasia (Cramer, 1777)
Napata rabdonota Hampson, 1898
Nyridela chalciope Hübner, 1898
Opharus bimaculata (Dewitz, 1877)
Pachydota albiceps (Walker, 1856)
Pheia daphaena Hampson, 1898
Pseudamastus alsa alsa (Druce, 1890)
Pseudamastus alsa lalannei Toulgoët, 1985
Syntomeida epilais epilais (Walker, 1954)
Syntomeida melanthus merletti Chalumeau & Howden, 1978
Utetheisa ornatrix (Linné, 1758)

Cossidae
Givera species

Notodontidae
Nystalea nyseus (Cramer, 1775)
Nystalea ebalea (Stoll, 1780)
Proalymiotis aequipars (Walker, 1858)
Rhuda focula (Stoll, 1780)
Malocampa punctata (Stoll, 1780)
Rifargia occulta Schaus, 1905
Disphragis cubana (Grote, 1865)
Hemiceras domingonis Dyar, 1908
Rhuda focula (Stoll, 1780)
Dasylophia lucia Schaus, 1901

Sphingidae
Agrius cingulatus (Fabricius, 1775)
Cocytius antaeus (Drury, 1773)
Cocytius duponchel (Poey, 1832)
Neococytius cluentius (Cramer, 1779)
Manduca rustica harterti (Rotschild, 1894)
Manduca sexta luciae (Johanssen, 1764)
Protambulyx strigilis (Linné, 1771)
Pseudosphinx tetrio (Linné, 1771)
Erinnyis lassauxi (Boisduval, 1859)
Erinnyis ello (Linné, 1758)
Erinnyis alope (Drury, 1773)
Erinnyis obscura (Fabricius, 1775)
Erinnyis oenotrus (Stoll, 1780)
Erinnyis crameri (Schauss, 1898)
Pachylia ficus (Linné, 1758)
Pachylia syces syces (Hübner, 1822)
Enyo lugubris (Linné, 1771)
Enyo ocypete (Linné, 1758)
Madoryx oiclus (Cramer, 1779)
Perigonia lusca (Fabricius, 1777)
Aellopos tantalus (Linné, 1758)
Aellopos fadus (Cramer, 1775)
Eumorpha vitis (Linné, 1758)
Eumorpha fasciatus (Sulzer, 1776)
Eumorpha labruscae (Linné, 1758)
Eumorpha obliquus guadelupensis Chalumeau & Delplanque, 1974
Xylophanes tersa (Linné, 1771)
Xylophanes pluto (Fabricius, 1777)
Xylophanes chiron necchus (Cramer, 1779)
Hyles lineata (Fabricius, 1775)

Geometridae
Acratodes noctuata Guenée, 1858
Acratodes praepeditaria (Möschler, 1890)
Ametris nitocris (Cramer, 1780)
Anisodes ordinata rubrior Herbulot, 1988
Anisodes urcearia Guenée, 1858
Chloropteryx glauciptera (Hampson, 1895)
Cyclomia mopsaria Guenée, 1858
Cyclophora nanaria (Walker, 1861)
Disclisioprocta stellata (Guenée, 1857)
Drepanodes ephyrata Guenée, 1857
Eois tegularia (Guenée, 1857)
Epimecis detexta detexta (Walker, 1860)
Epimecis detexta leduchatae Herbulot, in litt
Erastria decrepitaria (Hübner, 1823)
Erosina hyberniata Guenée 1857
Eueana simplaria Herbulot, 1986
Euphyia perturbata (Walker, 1862)
Eupithecia acidalioides (Kaye, 1901)
Eupithecia carribeana Herbulot, 1986
Eupithecia comes Herbulot, 1986
Eupithecia lecerfiata Herbulot, 1984
Eupithecia velutipennis Herbulot, 1986
Hydata insatisfacta Herbulot, 1988
Leptocnenopsis tatochorda Prout, 1916
Lobocleta indecora Warren, 1900
Lobocleta martinicensis Herbulot, 1985
Lobocleta tricuspida Herbulot, 1985
Macrosema immaculata (Warren, 1897)
Malanolophia lalanneae Herbulot, 1985
Melanchroia chephise (Stoll, 1782)
Melanolophia ludovici Herbulot, 1995
Melanolophia rufimontis Herbulot, 1986
Nemoria rectilinea (Warren, 1906)
Nepheloleuca complicata (Guenée, 1857)
Nepheloleuca politia (Cramer, 1777)
Obila defensata (Walker, 1862)
Oenoptila nigrilineata venusta Warren, 1900
Oospila confundaria (Möschler, 1890)
Oxydia brevipecten Herbulot, 1985
Oxydia lalanneorum Herbulot, 1985
Oxydia vesulia alternata (Warren, 1905)
Pero astapa (Druce, 1892)
Pero lignata (Warren, 1897)
Pero rectisectaria (Herrich-Schäffer, 1855)
Phrudocentra centrifugaria impunctata (Warren, 1909)
Phrygionis cruorata Warren, 1905
Phrygionis dominica Prout, 1933
Pleuroplucha molitaria guadelupa Herbulot, 1995
Psaliodes subochreofusa Herbulot, 1988
Pterocypha lezardata Herbulot, 1988
Ptychamalia perlata nigricostata (Warren, 1907)
Scelolophia terminata fragmentata (Warren, 1904)
Scopula umbilicata (Fabricius, 1794)
Semaeopus caecaria distinctata (Warren, 1900)
Semaeopus indignaria (Guenée, 1858)
Semaeopus subrubra dominicana Prout, 1918
Semaeopus vincentii luciae Prout, 1938
Semiothisa praelongata bruni Herbulot, 1985
Semiothisa everiata (Guenée, 1857)
Sericoptera mahometaria (Herrich-Schäffer, 1853)
Sphacelodes brunneata Warren, 1907
Synchlora cupedinaria guadelupensis Herbulot, 1988
Synchlora frondaria Guenée, 1857
Synchlora herbaria intacta (Warren, 1905)
Synchlora isolata (Warren, 1900)
Tricentrogyna crocantha Herbulot, 1988
Tricentrogyna rubricosta (Hampson, 1895)
Xanthorhoe picticolor Warren, 1990

Psychidae
Oiketicus kirbyi Guilding, 1827

Yponomeutidae
Atteva aurea (Fitch, 1856)

Noctuidae
Acroria terens (Walker, 1857)
Achaea ablunaris (Guenée, 1852)
Agrapha oxygramma (Geyer, 1832)
Agrotis malefida Guenée, 1852
Agrotis repleta Walker, 1857
Agrotis subterranea (Fabricius, 1794)
Alabama argillacea (Hübner, 1823)
Amyna octo (Guenée, 1852)
Anicla infecta (Ochsenheimer, 1816)
Anomis editrix (Guenée, 1852)
Anomis illita Guenée, 1852
Anomis impasta Guenée, 1852
Antachara diminuta (Guenée, 1852)
Antiblemma concinnula (Walker, 1865)
Antiblemma imitans (Walker, 1858)
Anticarsia gemmatalis Hübner, 1818
Argyrogramma basigera (Walker, 1865)
Argyrogramma verruca (Fabricius, 1794)
Ascalapha odorata (Linné, 1758)
Autoplusia illustrata (Guenée, 1852)
Azeta repugnalis (Hübner, 1825)
Bagisara repanda (Fabricius, 1793)
Baniana ostia Druce, 1898
Baniana veluticollis Hampson, 1898
Bleptina araealis (Hampson, 1901)
Bleptina hydrillalis Guenée, 1854
Callopistria floridensis (Guenée, 1852)
Callopistria mexicana Druce, 1889
Catabena vitrina (Walker 1857)
Caularis undulans Walker, 1857
Characoma nilotica (Rogenhofer, 1881)
Coenipeta bibitrix (Hübner, 1823)
Coenobela paucula (Walker, 1858)
Collomena filifera (Walker, 1857)
Concana mundissima Walker, 1857
Condica albigera (Guenée, 1852)
Condica circuita (Guenée, 1852)
Condica concisa (Walker, 1856)
Condica cupentia (Cramer, 1779)
Condica mobilis (Walker, 1856)
Condica sutor (Guénée, 1852)
Condica vacillans (Walker, 1858)
Cropia infusa (Walker, 1857)
Cydosia nobilitella (Cramer, 1779)
Diphthera festiva (Fabricius, 1775)
Dipterygia ordinarius (Butler, 1879)
Dipterygia pallida (Dognin, 1907)
Dyomyx jugator Le Duchat d'Aubigny, 1992
Elaphria agrotina (Guenée, 1852)
Elaphria chalcedonia (Hübner, 1808)
Elaphria deltoides (Möschler, 1880)
Elaphria devara (Druce, 1898)
Elaphria nucicolora (Guenée, 1852)
Ephyrodes cacata Guenée, 1852
Epidromia pannosa Guenée, 1852
Eriopyga herbuloti Le Duchat d'Aubigny, 1992
Eublemma cinnamomea (Herrich-Schäffer, 1868)
Eublemma recta (Guenée, 1852)
Eudocima materna (Linné, 1767)
Eulepidotis addens (Walker, 1858)
Eulepidotis modestula (Herrich-Schäffer, 1869)
Eulepidotis superior (Guenée, 1852)
Eutelia ablatrix (Guenée, 1852)
Eutelia piratica Schaus, 1940
Feltia subterranea (Fabricius, 1794)
Glympis eubolialis (Walker, 1865)
Gonodes liquida (Möschler, 1886)
Gonodonta bidens Geyer, 1832
Gonodonta incurva (Sepp, 1840)
Gonodonta nutrix (Stoll, 1780)
Gonodonta parens Guenée, 1852
Gonodonta sicheas (Cramer, 1777)
Helicoverpa zea (Boddie, 1850)
Heliothis subflexa (Guenée, 1852)
Heliothis virescens (Fabricius, 1777)
Hemeroblemma opigena (Drury, 1773)
Hemeroplanis scopulepes Haworth, 1809
Hemicephalis characteria (Stoll, 1790)
Heripyga herbuloti Duchat d'Aubigny Marti et al., 2000
Hormoschista latipalpis (Walker, 1858)
Hypena abjuralis Walker, 1858
Hypena androna Druce, 1890
Hypena loxo Druce, 1890
Hypena minualis Guenée, 1854
Hypena porrectalis (Fabricius, 1794)
Hypena vetustalis Guenée, 1854
Hypocala andremona (Stoll, 1781)
Isogona scindens (Walker, 1858)
Janseodes melanospila (Guenée, 1852)
Kakopoda progenies (Guenée, 1852)
Lascoria orneodalis (Guenée, 1854)
Lesmone cinerea (Butler, 1878)
Lesmone formularis (Geyer, 1837)
Lesmone hinna (Geyer, 1837)
Lesmone porcia (Stoll, 1790)
Letis hypnois (Hübner, 1821)
Letis mycerina (Cramer, 1777)
Leucania chejela (Schaus, 1921)
Leucania dorsalis Walker, 1856
Leucania humidicola Guenée, 1852
Leucania inconspicua Herrich-Schäffer, 1868
Leucania juncicola Guenée, 1852
Leucania latiuscula Herrich-Schäffer, 1868
Leucania senescens Möschler, 1890
Leucania subpunctata (Harvey, 1875)
Litoprosopus bahamensis Hampson, 1926
Lophophora clanymoides Möschler, 1890
Magusa orbifera (Walker, 1857)
Makapta varians (Hampson, 1926)
Mamestra soligena Möschler, 1886
Massala asema Hampson, 1926
Massala obvertens (Walker, 1858)
Mastigophorus latipennis Herrich-Schäffer, 1870
Melipotis acontioides (Guenée, 1852)
Melipotis contorta (Guenée, 1852)
Melipotis famelica (Guenée, 1852)
Melipotis famelica (Guenée, 1852)
Melipotis fasciolaris (Hübner, 1825)
Melipotis goniosema (Hampson, 1926)
Melipotis januaris (Guenée, 1852)
Melipotis ochrodes (Guenée, 1852)
Metalectra analis Schaus, 1916
Metalectra praecisalis Hübner, 1823
Metallata absumens (Walker, 1862)
Metria decessa (Walker, 1857)
Metria permixta (Schaus, 1911)
Micrathetis triplex (Walker, 1857)
Mocis latipes (Guenée, 1852)
Mocis megas (Guenée, 1852)
Mocis repanda (Fabricius, 1794)
Motya abseuzalis Walker, 1859
Motya flotsama (Dyar, 1914)
Mouralia tinctoides (Guenée, 1852)
Nagara clara (Stoll, 1782)
Neogalea sunia (Guenée, 1852)
Neophaenis meterythra Hampson, 1908
Neostictoptera species
Nola bistriga (Möschler, 1890)
Obrima pyraloides Walker, 1856
Ommatochila mundula (Zeller, 1872)
Ophisma tropicalis Guenée, 1852
Orthodes vesquesa (Dyar, 1913)
Paectes arcigera (Guenée, 1852)
Paectes canofusa (Hampson, 1898)
Paectes obrotunda (Guenée, 1852)
Palthis angustipennis Schaus, 1916
Panula inconstans Guenée, 1852
Parachabora abydas (Herrich-Schäffer, 1869)
Paratrachea species
Perasia garnoti (Guenée, 1852)
Peteroma carilla Schaus, 1901
Phalaenophana eudorealis (Guenée, 1854)
Phlyctaina irrigualis Möschler, 1890
Phyprosopus tristriga (Herrich-Schäffer, 1868)
Physula albipunctilla Schaus, 1916
Plusiodonta thomae Guenée, 1852
Ponometia exigua (Fabricius, 1793)
Pseudaletia species
Pseudaletia sequax Franclemont, 1951
Pseudoplusia includens (Walker, 1857)
Ptichodes immunis (Guenée, 1852)
Radara nealcesalis (Walker, 1859)
Radara tauralis (Walker, 1865)
Rejectaria karukerensis Lalanne-Cassou, 1992
Remigia latipes Guenée, 1852
Remigia repanda (Fabricius, 1794)
Renodes aequalis (Walker, 1865)
Renodes liturata (Walker, 1865)
Rhamnocampa species
Rivula pusilla Möschler, 1890
Selenisa sueroides (Guenée, 1852)
Speocropia scriptura (Walker, 1858)
Spodoptera albula (Walker, 1857)
Spodoptera androgea (Stoll, 1782)
Spodoptera dolichos (Fabricius, 1794)
Spodoptera eridania (Stoll, 1782)
Spodoptera exigua (Hübner, 1808)
Spodoptera frugiperda (J.E. Smith, 1797)
Spodoptera latifascia (Walker, 1856)
Spodoptera ornithogalli (Guenée, 1852)
Spodoptera sunia Malausa & Kermarrec, 1982
Spragueia margana (Fabricius, 1794)
Spragueia perstructana (Walker, 1865)
Syllectra congemmalis Hübner, 1823
Syllectra erycata (Cramer, 1780)
Synalamis toulgoeti Lalanne-Cassou, 1992
Tandilia rodea (Schaus, 1894)
Tetanolita borgesalis (Walker, 1859)
Thioptera nigrofimbria (Guenée, 1852)
Thursania grandirenalis Schaus, 1916
Toxonprucha diffundens (Walker, 1858)
Tripudia luda (Druce, 1898)
Tripudia quadrifera (Zeller, 1874)
Xanthopastis timais (Cramer, [1780])
Zale erilda Schaus, 1940
Zale fictilis (Guenée, 1852)
Zale peruncta (Guenée, 1852)
Zale strigimacula (Guenée, 1852)

Pterophoridae
Adaina ambrosiae (Murtfeldt, 1880)
Adaina bipunctata (Möschler, 1890)
Adaina ipomoeae Bigot & Etienne, 2009
Exelastis montischristi (Walsingham, 1897)
Hepalastis pumilio (Zeller, 1873)
Lantanophaga pusillidactyla (Walker, 1864)
Megalorrhipida leucodactyla (Fabricius, 1794)
Ochyrotica fasciata Walsingham, 1891
Oidaematophorus devriesi Landry & Gielis, 1992
Sphenarches anisodactylus (Walker, 1864)
Stenoptilodes brevipennis (Zeller, 1874)

Pyralidae
Aethiophysa falcatalis (Hampson, 1895)
Argyria lacteella (Fabricius, 1794)
Azochis euvexalis (Möschler, 1890)
Bonchis munitalis (Lederer, 1863)
Caphys bilineata (Stoll, [1781])
Cliniodes euphrosinalis Möschler, 1886
Condylorrhiza vestigialis (Guenée, 1854)
Cryptobotys zoilusalis (Walker, 1859)
Desmia flebilialis (Guenée, 1854)
Desmia funeralis (Hübner, 1796)
Diaphania costata (Fabricius, 1775)
Diaphania elegans (Möschler, 1890)
Diaphania hyalinata (Linnaeus, 1767)
Diatraea saccharalis (Fabricius, 1794)
Epicorsia cerata (Fabricius, 1795)
Epitamyra minusculalis (Möschler, 1890)
Eulepte concordalis Hübner, 1825
Eulepte gastralis (Guenée, 1854)
Glyphodes sibillalis Walker, 1859
Herpetogramma phaeopteralis (Guenée, 1854)
Hymenia perspectalis (Hübner, 1796)
Hypsopygia nostralis (Guenée, 1854)
Hypsipyla grandella (Zeller, 1848)
Loxomorpha cambogialis (Guenée, 1854)
Microthyris prolongalis (Guenée, 1854)
Omiodes humeralis Guenée, 1854
Omiodes indicata (Fabricius, 1775)
Omiodes martyralis (Lederer, 1863)
Pachypalpia dispilalis Hampson, 1895
Palpita isoscelalis gourbeyrensis Munroe, 1959
Palpita persimilis Munroe, 1959
Palpita viettei Munroe, 1959
Pococera atramentalis (Lederer, 1863)
Pococera scabridella (Ragonot, 1889)
Polygrammodes eleuata (Fabricius, 1777)
Portentomorpha xanthialis (Guenée, 1854)
Rhectocraspeda periusalis (Walker, 1859)
Sathria internitalis (Guenée, 1854)
Sparagmia gonoptera (Latreille, 1828)
Syllepte pactolalis (Guenée, 1854)
Syngamia florella (Stoll in Cramer & Stoll, 1781)
Triuncidia eupalusalis (Walker, 1859)

Plutellidae
Plutella xylostella (Linné, 1758)

Gracillariidae
Macrosaccus gliricidius Davis, 2011

Tortricidae
Lorita insulicola Razowski & Becker, 2007

References

Les Arthopodes continentaux de Guadeloupe

Lepidoptera
Lepidoptera

Guadeloupe
Guadeloupe
Guadeloupe
Guadeloupe